Air Headquarters (SLAF-HQ) is the Headquarters of Sri Lanka Air Force, located in SLAF Colombo, Slave Island, Colombo. Initially it was established in Colombo on 2 March 1951.

See also
 Office of the Chief of Defence Staff
 Army Headquarters (Sri Lanka)
 Naval Headquarters (Sri Lanka)

References 

Sri Lanka Air Force
Colombo
Military headquarters in Sri Lanka
Sri Lanka